The Bank of Pinole is located at 2361 San Pablo Ave. in Pinole, California. Located in Old Town Pinole The Bank of Pinole was built in 1915 by E.M. Downer, Sr. and remained as a bank till the 1960s. It is currently owned by the City of Pinole and currently does not have a tenant.

It is a one-story building.

See also
National Register of Historic Places listings in Contra Costa County, California

References

External links 
Pinole Historical Society

History of Contra Costa County, California
Historic districts on the National Register of Historic Places in California
National Register of Historic Places in Contra Costa County, California
Bank buildings on the National Register of Historic Places in California